Kevin Denney (born January 27, 1978) is an American country music artist. Signed to Lyric Street Records in 2001, he made his debut on the country music scene with the release of his self-titled album (2002’s Kevin Denney), which produced three chart singles, including "That's Just Jessie", a Top 20 hit on the Billboard Hot Country Singles & Tracks (now Hot Country Songs) charts. He was dropped from Lyric Street's roster in 2003, although he co-wrote a track on Tracy Byrd's 2006 Different Things album.

Biography
Denney's interest in music began at an early age. His mother and father, both of whom sang in a gospel music quartet, bought Denney his first guitar when he was three years old. He also became a frequent listener of the Grand Ole Opry radio shows, and played in his cousin's bluegrass music band.

At age 17, however, he briefly stopped focusing on his musical interests to re-assess his future. On his eighteenth birthday, his girlfriend took him to a George Strait concert. Seeing Strait in concert helped Denney discover that music was his passion, and he later joined a local band that was looking for a lead singer. Denney later went solo, and was signed to Lyric Street Records in 2001. His eponymous debut album, released in 2002, produced three charting singles on the Hot Country Songs charts: "That's Just Jessie" at number 16, "Cadillac Tears" at number 30 and "It'll Go Away" at number 43. He also contributed a rendition of "White Christmas" to the label's multi-artist compilation No Wrapping Required.

In late 2003, Denney charted a fourth single, "A Year at a Time," which peaked at number 44 on the country charts. The song did not appear on an album, and Denney exited the label.

He co-wrote a track on Tracy Byrd's 2006 album Different Things, and Craig Morgan's 2009 single "Bonfire." He also co-wrote "Don't Ask Me About a Woman", a song recorded by Easton Corbin on his 2010 self-titled debut album.

Discography

Studio albums

Singles

Music videos

References

1976 births
American country singer-songwriters
Country musicians from Kentucky
Living people
Lyric Street Records artists
Singer-songwriters from Kentucky
People from Monticello, Kentucky
21st-century American singers